A displaced threshold or DTHR is a runway threshold located at a point other than the physical beginning or end of the runway.

The portion of the runway behind a displaced threshold may be used for takeoff in either direction and landings from the opposite direction. After landing at the other end, the landing aircraft may use the area behind the displaced threshold for roll out.

Most often, the offset threshold is in place to give arriving aircraft clearance over an obstruction, while still allowing departing aircraft the maximum amount of runway available. A displaced threshold may also be introduced as a noise mitigation measure for the communities overflown on approach, or if a beginning section of the runway is no longer able to sustain the continuous impact from landing aircraft. Aircraft are expected to land beyond the displaced threshold. Departing aircraft are permitted to use the section of the runway behind a displaced threshold for takeoffs or landing rollouts from the opposite direction even if the reason for the displacement is lowered pavement resistance, because those aircraft are not impacting the runway with the force of a landing aircraft.

A portion of the runway behind a displaced threshold has three markings:
 White arrows along the center line of the runway
 White arrow heads across the width of the runway just prior to the displaced threshold bar

This produces a 1.5 km portion of runway that cannot be used for landing in this direction. This, in turn decreases the available landing length on runway 29L to 2,970 m (9,744 ft). The purpose of this large threshold displacement is to reduce noise generated by landing aircraft over nearby localities.

Runway 22R at John F. Kennedy International Airport has a displaced threshold due to noise abatement. This shortens the landing distance available to just  for the  runway.

References

Airport infrastructure